The Rochester metropolitan area may refer to:

The Rochester metropolitan area, New York, United States
The Rochester metropolitan area, Minnesota, United States

See also
Rochester (disambiguation)